The Drane House was a historic house at 1004 South First Street in Rogers, Arkansas.  It was a -story brick I-house, three bays wide, with a side gable roof.  A single-story porch extended across its front facade, supported by wooden box columns and topped by an open balustraded porch.  The upper porch was accessed by a centered doorway which has a small gable above.  Built c. 1890, it was a rare brick building from the first decade of Rogers' settlement.

The house was listed on the National Register of Historic Places in 1988.  It was later demolished, and was delisted in 2018.

See also
National Register of Historic Places in Benton County, Arkansas

References

Houses on the National Register of Historic Places in Arkansas
Houses completed in 1890
Houses in Rogers, Arkansas
National Register of Historic Places in Benton County, Arkansas
Demolished buildings and structures in Arkansas
Former National Register of Historic Places in Arkansas
I-houses in Arkansas
1890 establishments in Arkansas